José Gervasio Gómez Pereira (born 23 October 1949) was a professional footballer with Uruguayan club C.A. Cerro and was part of the Uruguayan Squad at the World Cup in Germany in 1974. He played as a forward.

References

1949 births
Living people
Uruguayan footballers
Uruguayan expatriate footballers
Uruguay international footballers
1974 FIFA World Cup players
Uruguayan Primera División players
C.A. Cerro players
Centro Atlético Fénix players
Defensor Sporting players
Deportivo Alavés players
C.S. Emelec footballers
Liverpool F.C. (Montevideo) players
Expatriate footballers in Spain
Expatriate footballers in Ecuador
Association football forwards